= Markus Rupp =

Markus Rupp from the Technical University Vienna, Wien, Austria was named Fellow of the Institute of Electrical and Electronics Engineers (IEEE) in 2015 for contributions to adaptive filters and communication technologies. He received the Dipl.- Ing. degree from the University of Saarbrücken, Germany, in 1988, and the Dr.-Ing. degree from Technische Universität Darmstadt, Germany, in 1993. Until 1995, he had a post-doctoral position with the University of California at Santa Barbara, Santa Barbara, where he worked with Sanjit Mitra and Ali Sayed on robust learning algorithms. From 1995 to 2001, he was a Member of the Technical Staff of the Wireless Technology Research Department, Bell-Laboratories at Crawford Hill, Holmdel, NJ, USA, where he worked on multiple antenna systems. During his Bell-labs time, he spent one and a half years at Nieuwegein in the Netherlands working on the first WLAN systems. He was an Associate Editor of IEEE TRANSACTIONS ON SIGNAL PROCESSING from 2002 to 2005. He served as General Technical Chair for the IEEE International Conference on Acoustics, Speech, and Signal Processing (ICASSP) in 2020 and 2026. From 2004 to 2012, he was a member of the BoD of EURASP, the European Society for Signal Processing, serving as president from 2011-2012. Since October 2001, he has been a Full Professor of digital signal processing in mobile communications at Technische Universität Wien, Austria, where he founded the Christian-Doppler Laboratory for Design Methodology of Signal Processing Algorithms in 2002. He served as department head and dean of faculty until 2019.
